John William "Schoolboy" Ricks (September 1, 1919 – July 15, 1987) was an American baseball shortstop and pitcher in the Negro leagues. He played from 1944 to 1950 with the Philadelphia Stars. He pitched for the Fort Wayne General Electric team in 1949. Ricks was named the MVP of the National Baseball Congress Tournament in 1949 after posting 3 wins and striking out 30 in 26 1/3 innings. He signed with the Winona Chiefs in July 1950. He also played for the Granby Red Sox of the Provincial League in 1951.

References

External links
 and Seamheads

Philadelphia Stars players
Granby Red Sox players
Baseball players from North Carolina
1919 births
1987 deaths
20th-century African-American sportspeople
Baseball pitchers